Air Marshal Surendra Kumar Ghotia, PVSM, VSM is a retired officer of the Indian Air Force. He served as the Air Officer Commanding-in-Chief (AOC-in-C), South Western Air Command till 30 April 2021. He assumed the office on 1 October 2019 following Air Marshal Harjit Singh Arora's elevation to Vice Chief of the Air Staff. He superannuated on 30 April 2021 after almost 40 years of service. He was succeeded by Air Marshal Sandeep Singh

Early life and education 
Ghotia is an alumnus of National Defence Academy Khadakwasla. He has undergone Air Staff course at Defence Services Staff College Wellington as well as Higher Air Command course at College of Air Warfare Secunderabad. He holds two master's degrees.

Career
Ghotia was commissioned in the Indian Air Force as a fighter pilot in December 1981. He has over 3000 hours of flying experience on different aircraft. He is also a qualified instructor with instructional experience of more than 1000 hours.

His various field appointments include commanding a fighter squadron, chief operations officer, and station commander of a forward air base in South Western Air Command. He has served in a number of staff appointments including director intelligence at Air Headquarters, staff officer of fighter operations in Western Air Command, principal director training (flying) at Air Headquarters, assistant chief of air staff (intelligence), air officer commanding of COBRA group, and air attache at embassy of India in Paris.

Ghotia assumed office of Senior Air Staff Officer, Training Command on 20 June 2016 and served in that capacity till his appointment as AOC-in-C, Training Command.

He served as Air Officer Commanding-in-Chief (AOC-in-C), Training Command from 1 May 2019 succeeding Air Marshal Rakesh Kumar Singh Bhadauria, to 30 September 2019.

Honours and decorations 
During his career, Ghotia has been awarded the commendation by Air Officer Commanding-in-chief, Western Air Command in 1994, commendation by Chief of Air Staff in 1998, Vishisht Seva Medal (VSM) in 2007, and Param Vishisht Seva Medal (PVSM) in January 2020 for his service.

Personal life 
He is married to Nirmala Ghotia who served as the President of Air Force Wives Welfare Association (Regional), and they have two daughters.

References 

Living people
Indian Air Force air marshals
National Defence Academy (India) alumni
Recipients of the Vishisht Seva Medal
Year of birth missing (living people)
Indian air attachés
College of Air Warfare alumni
Defence Services Staff College alumni